Cham Shan Monastery is a Buddhist monastery in Hong Kong. It is located at 73 Lung Ha Wan Road, Clear Water Bay Peninsula.

History
Cham Shan Monastery was built in 1964.

Features
The Great Buddha's Hall is one of the largest in Hong Kong. The monastery is a popular filming location for costume dramas.

References

External links

 Official website 

Buddhist temples in Hong Kong
Buddhist monasteries in Hong Kong
Clear Water Bay